James Madison Toy (February 20, 1858 – March 13, 1919) was an early Major League Baseball player, possibly with Native American ancestry, having a short two-year career with the Cleveland Blues  and the Brooklyn Gladiators, both of the American Association.

Career
Born in Beaver Falls, Pennsylvania, Jim began his professional baseball career in the International League for the Utica, New York team. He showed his versatility by playing many different positions, as well as having a well known good throwing arm.

This showing earned him a spot on the Cleveland Blues for the  season, where he played in 109 games, batted .222, and played mainly at first base, but again showed his ability at other positions, including catcher, and all three outfield positions.

He joined the Gladiators later that season, playing in 44 games, batting .181, and gathering only seven RBI. His career ended after suffering an injury when he was hit with a foul tip in the groin. Because of the lack of modern medical attention, the injury plagued him throughout the rest of his life along with cutting his career short.

First Native American player?
According to writer Ed Rice, Louis Sockalexis was the first American Indian player in major league baseball. In 1963, baseball writer Lee Allen claimed, without solid evidence, that Toy's father was Lakota. This claim was disputed by Rice, who located Toy's death certificate listing his race as "white".

Modern historians have become less worried about whether the player is a "full-blooded" Native American, but rather if the player identified and aligned himself socially and culturally with his native people. Sockalexis fits this view of history, unlike Toy, who did not.

Jim died at the age of 61 in Cresson, Pennsylvania, and is interred at Beaver Cemetery in Beaver, Pennsylvania.

References

External links

 

1858 births
1919 deaths
Native American baseball players
Baseball players from Pennsylvania
Major League Baseball first basemen
Major League Baseball catchers
Cleveland Blues (1887–88) players
Brooklyn Gladiators players
19th-century baseball players
New Brighton (minor league baseball) players
Rochester Flour Cities players
Utica Pent Ups players
Oswego Starchboxes players
Augusta Browns players
Rochester Jingoes players